Byron Delos Shear (May 12, 1869 – June 9, 1929) was an American politician who served as Mayor of Oklahoma City, Oklahoma in the 1910s.

Biography
Shear was born on May 12, 1869 in Hillsboro, Wisconsin, conflicting reports have been given on the exact date. His father, Thomas J. Shear, was a member of the Wisconsin State Assembly. In 1892, Shear married Hulda Ludwig. She died in 1901. He married Ida Malinda Cunningham. Shear's brother-in-law, Oscar A. Mitscher, was also Mayor of Oklahoma City and his nephew, Marc Mitscher, was an Admiral in the United States Navy. He died on June 9, 1929.

Career
Shear was Mayor from December 25, 1918 until April 7, 1919. Additionally, he was a delegate to the 1924 Republican National Convention. He succeeded Ed Overholser and preceded Jack C. Walton as mayor.

References

External links
The Political Graveyard

Daily Oklahoman Archives

People from Hillsboro, Wisconsin
Mayors of Oklahoma City
Oklahoma Republicans
1869 births
1929 deaths
Burials in Oklahoma